Qaleh-ye Maraghush (also Romanized as Qal‘eh-ye Marāghūsh, Qal‘ehmarāghūsh, and Qal‘eh Marāghūsh) is a village in Guney-ye Gharbi Rural District, Tasuj District, Shabestar County, East Azerbaijan Province, Iran. At the 2006 census, its population was 271, in 56 families.

References 

Populated places in Shabestar County